The Christian Social Party of Liechtenstein (German: Christlich-Soziale Partei Liechtensteins, CSP) was a political party in Liechtenstein.

History
The party was established in 1961, In the 1962 elections it received 10% of the vote, but failed to win a seat in the Landtag. It appealed to the Constitutional Court, which subsequently ruled that the 18% electoral threshold was unconstitutional. However, the party failed to win a seat in elections in 1966, 1970 and 1974.

It did not contest the 1978 or 1982 elections.

Electoral results

References

Defunct Christian political parties
Catholic political parties
Defunct political parties in Liechtenstein
Political parties established in 1961
1961 establishments in Liechtenstein